Sir Alexander Grant, 5th Baronet (1 July 1705 - 1 August 1772) was prominent Scottish slave trader, active in the City of London in the mid eighteenth century. As part of Grant, Oswald and Co., he owned Bunce Island in Sierra Leone.

Alexander was born in Dalvey, Inverness-shire, the son of Patrick Grant. He took a correspondence course with the University of Aberdeen in pharmacy. However, when the family finances were affected by their support for the Jacobites, he emigrated to Jamaica in 1721, where he practiced in "Physick and Chiurgery". By 1730 he bought a plantation of 300 acres in Saint Elizabeth Parish. He also went into business with Peter Beckford junior, leasing a storehouse from which they sold supplies to their fellow plantation owners.

References

1705 births
1772 deaths
Scottish slave traders
Baronets in the Baronetage of Nova Scotia
Scottish slave owners